Movie channels are television specialty channels that present film content.

Popular movie channels:
 AMC Networks
 AMC
 Europa Europa (Latin America)
 Film & Arts (Latin America)
 IFC (United States and Canada)
 SundanceTV (United States)
 Legend (United Kingdom) part of the CBS-AMC Networks UK Channels Partnership
 Aruj TV (Pakistan)
Aflam TV (Morocco)
Al Hayat Cinema (Egypt)
Al Bait Baitak Cinema (Egypt)
Al Masraweya Cinema (Egypt)
Al Nahar Movies (Egypt)
Al Nahar Cinema (Egypt)
 Amazon/MGM
 MGM HD (United States)
 MGM+ (United States)
 This TV (United States)
 ART
ART Aflam 1 (MENA)
ART Aflam 2 (MENA)
ART Cinema (MENA)
ART Movies (MENA)
Cima (Egypt)
beIN Media Group
beIN MOVIES HD 1 (MENA)
beIN MOVIES HD 2 (MENA)
beIN MOVIES HD 3 (MENA)
beIN MOVIES HD 4 (MENA)
BTV Film (China)
 Bioskop Indonesia (Indonesian)
 C More Entertainment
 C More First (Scandinavia)
 C More Hits (Scandinavia)
 C More Stars (Scandinavia)
 SF-kanalen (Scandinavia)
 Canal+ Group
 Canal+ Cinéma (France & Africa)
 Canal+ Film (Poland)
 Canal+ Zat Lenn (Myanmar)
 Ciné+ (France & Africa)
 Canal Hollywood (Portugal and Spain)
 CBS Europa 
CBH Cinema (Egypt)
 CCTV-6 (China)
 CME
bTV Cinema (Bulgaria)
Nova Cinema (Czech Republic)
Pro Cinema (Romania)
 Cine34 (Italy)
 CINE.AR (Argentina)
 Cine Español por Movistar Plus+ (Spain)
 Cine Mo! (Philippines)
 Cinelatino (United States)
 Cinema1 (Pakistan)
 Cinema One (Philippines)
Cairo Cinema (Egypt)
Cinema 1 (MENA)
Cinema 2 (MENA)
Cinema Pro (Egypt)
CinemaWorld (Singapore, Taiwan, Malaysia, Indonesia, Philippines, Vietnam, China and Sri Lanka)
 Citra Bioskop (Indonesian)
 Comcast/Sky
 Sky Cinema (Italy)
 Sky Cinema (United Kingdom)
 Sky Cinema (Germany)
 Culver Max Entertainment
 Sony Max (India)
 Sony Max 2 (India)
 Sony Pix (India)
 Sony Wah (India)
 De Película (various countries)
 DM Dhoom (Pakistan)
Darbaka Aflam (Egypt)
Darbaka Cinema (Egypt)
Diema (Bulgaria)
 Disney
Fox Movies
MENA
Portugal
 FXM (United States)
 LMN (United States)
 STAR Movies (Philippines, MENA, China, Vietnam and India)
 UTV (India)
 UTV Action (India)
 UTV Movies (India)
 DTV Cinéma (Algeria)
 Emax (Pakistan)
El Sobki Cinema (Egypt)
 Escape (United States)
 Falak TV (Pakistan)
 Film+ (Hungary)
 Film4
 Hungary
 United Kingdom
 Filmcafe
 Film Mánia
 Filmazia (Pakistan)
 Film Now (Romania)
 FilmBox (European & United States)
 Filmbox (MENA)
 Film World (Pakistan)
 For you (Italy)
 Fox Corporation
 Movies! (United States)
 FLiK (Indonesian)
 Foxtel Movies (Australia)
 Grit (United States)
 Hallmark Movies & Mysteries (United States)
 HNTV Movie Channel (China)
 HDNet Movies (United States)
 IFilm (Iran)
 IRIB Namayesh (Iran)
 Iris (Italy)
 JSBC Films & Series Channel (China)
 Kino Barrandov (Czech Republic)
 Kino Nova (Bulgaria)
 Kino Polska (Poland)
LCD Aflam (Egypt)
 Lionsgate
 MoviePlex (United States)
 Starz (United States)
 Starz Encore (United States)
 MegaFilm (Pakistan)
 MegaHits (Pakistan)
 Movistar Plus+
 Acción por Movistar Plus+ (Spain)
 Cine Español por Movistar Plus+ (Spain)
 Clásicos por Movistar Plus+ (Spain)
 Comedia por Movistar Plus+ (Spain)
 Drama por Movistar Plus+ (Spain)
 Estrenos por Movistar Plus+ (Spain)
 Estrenos 2 por Movistar Plus+ (Spain)
My Cinema Europe (Switzerland)
OTE Cinema (Greece)
Time Cinema (Egypt)
Time Taxi (Egypt)
Time Film (Egypt)
Top Movies TV
TekTok Aflam (Egypt)
TekTok Cinema (Egypt)
 Movie Central (Western Canada)
 Movie Central (Philippines)
 The Movie Network (Eastern Canada)
 Movies Now (India)
Melody Aflam (Egypt)
Melody Classic (Egypt)
M Classic (Egypt)
M Cinema (Egypt)
Moga Cinema (Egypt)
 Multivision Plus
 Galaxy (Indonesian)
 Galaxy Premium (Indonesian)
 IMC (Indonesian)
 Narrative Capital
Great! Movies (United Kingdom)
 Great! Movies Action (United Kingdom)
 Great! Movies Classic (United Kingdom)
 NOVA Cinema (Greece)
Nile Cinema (Egypt)
 Pinoy Box Office (Philippines)
Panorama Film (Egypt)
Panorama Cinema (Egypt)
Polsat Film (Poland)
Prima Max (Czech Republic)
 PixL (United States)
 Rai Movie (Italy)
 Raavi TV (Pakistan)
Paramount Global
 Flix (United States)
Colors Bangla Cinema (India)
Colors Cineplex (India)
Colors Cineplex Bollywood (India)
Colors Cineplex Superhits (India)
Colors Gujarati Cinema (India)
Colors Kannada Cinema (India)
 Paramount Channel (various countries)
 Showtime (United States)
 The Movie Channel (United States)
 Rotana Group
Rotana Classic (MENA)
Rotana Cinema KSA (MENA)
Rotana Cinema EGY (Egypt)
Rotana Aflam (MENA)
 Rede Telecine (Brazil)
 S7T (MENA)
SBS World Movies (Australia)
 ShortsTV (United States)
ShowMovies Comedy (MENA)
SuperMovies Horror (MENA)
ShowMovies Kids (MENA)
ShowMovies Action (MENA)
 Sony Pictures
 Cine Sony (United States)
 GetTV (United States)
 Sony Movie Channel (United States)
SuperMovies Thriller (MENA)
ShowMovies Family (MENA)
SuperMovies Classics (MENA)
 Somos (Spain)
 Sky Movies (New Zealand)
 Super Écran (Canada)
 Tagalized Movie Channel (Philippines)
 TVCine (Portugal)
Warner Bros. Discovery
 Cinemax (United States)
 Space (Latin America)
HBO
USA
 Europe
 Asia
 I.Sat (Latin America)
 WarnerTV Film (Germany)
 Turner Classic Movies (United States, UK, Nordic countries, Middle East, Africa and Asia Pacific)
 V Film (Scandinavia)
 CJ E&M
 OCN (South Korea)
 OCN Movies (South Korea)
 OCN Thrills (South Korea)
 TvN Movies (Singapore & Indonesian)
OSN
OSN Movies Premiere (MENA)
OSN Movies Premiere +2 (MENA)
OSN Movies Hollywood (MENA)
OSN Movies Action (MENA)
OSN Kids (MENA)
OSN Family (MENA)
 MBC Group
MBC Max (MENA)
MBC Bollywood (MENA)
MBC Action (MENA)
MBC2 (MENA)
Shandong Movie Channel (China)
Silver Screen (Pakistan)
SMG Oriental Film (China)
Star Channel (Japan)
Talking Pictures TV (United Kingdom)
Telecine (Brazil)
TF1 Séries Films (France)
 TV2 Csoport
 Mozi+ (Hungary)
 Moziverzum (Hungary)
Wowow
Wowow Cinema (Japan)
Cinefil Wowow (Japan)
 Zee Entertainment Enterprises
Zee Action (India)
Zee Aflam (MENA)
Zee Anmol Cinema (India)
Zee Bangla Cinema (India)
 Zee Bioskop (Indonesian)
Zee Biskope (India)
Zee Bollywood (India)
Zee Chitramandir (India)
Zee Cinema (India & United Kingdom)
Zee Cinemalu (India)
Zee Classic (India)
Zee Mundo (Spain)
Zee Picchar (India)
Zee Phim (Vietnam)
Zee Talkies (India)
Zee Theatre (India)
Zee Thirai (India)
&flix (India)
&pictures (India)
&privé HD (India)
&xplor HD (India)

movie television channels